"Fight Night" is a song by American hip hop group Migos. It was released on April 8, 2014 by Quality Control and 300 Entertainment as the first single from their mixtape No Label 2 (2014) and was produced by Stack Boy Twan. It peaked at number 69 on the US Billboard Hot 100 chart, making it the group's highest-charting single at the time. A remix was made by fellow American rapper Tyga.

Critical reception 
Brian Josephs of HotNewHipHop said that the song represents Migos' delivery of high-energy Atlanta rap, saying that "This isn't a throwaway track, but a confidently sold Bay Area Hyphy scene send-off."

Pitchfork ranked the song at number 56 on its list of the 100 Best Tracks of 2014. Pitchfork staff writer David Drake said "In its misunderstanding of a pre-existing template, it reached more directly for the pop jugular. Each line was quotable, delivered with the unapologetic confidence of a group willing to say whatever they can get away with. While perhaps not always the best bedroom strategy, 'Fight Night' does hit on the mania of lust more directly than anyone else."

Commercial performance
The song peaked at number 69 on the US Billboard Hot 100 chart in September 2014, making it their highest-charting single; until "Bad and Boujee", featuring Lil Uzi Vert would reach number one on the chart in early 2017.

Music video 
The music video for "Fight Night" was released on June 9th, 2014. Young Thug makes a cameo appearance in the video.

Awards and nominations

Charts

Weekly charts

Year-end charts

Certifications

References

External links 

2014 singles
2014 songs
Migos songs
300 Entertainment singles
Songs written by Quavo
Songs written by Offset (rapper)
Songs written by Takeoff (rapper)